The Thomas I. Agnew House is a historic home in New Brunswick, Middlesex County, New Jersey. The house was added to the National Register of Historic Places on May 13, 1982, for its significance in architecture. Also known as the Agnew Mansion, it is one of two surviving Greek Revival style houses in the city.

References

Buildings and structures in New Brunswick, New Jersey
National Register of Historic Places in Middlesex County, New Jersey
New Jersey Register of Historic Places
Houses on the National Register of Historic Places in New Jersey
Houses in Middlesex County, New Jersey
Houses completed in 1844
Greek Revival houses in New Jersey